The Cross of Liberty and the Monument to the War of  Independence is located in Freedom Square, Tallinn, Estonia. It was opened on 23 June 2009 as a memorial for those who fell during the Estonian War of Independence, through which the people of Estonia will be able to commemorate all those who had fought for freedom and independence. The pillar is 23.5 m high and consists of 143 glass plates. The memorial incorporates the Cross of Liberty, Estonia's most distinguished award established in 1919.

History
The idea of creating a monument was conceived in 1919, before the end of the war. During the War of Independence in 1918–1920, 4,000 people were killed, and 14,000 wounded on the Estonian side. In 1936, a law was passed to establish a nationwide monument in commemoration of the war. Preparatory work was interrupted by the Second World War and subsequent Soviet occupation. After Estonia regained independence in 1991, the question of establishing a national monument for the commemoration of the War of Independence was raised again. In the spring of 2005, the Riigikogu decided that a column of victory in memory of the War would be erected at the Freedom Square in Tallinn. In 2006, a design competition for the monument received more than 40 entries. The winning entry "Libertas" was designed by Rainer Sternfeld, Andri Laidre, Kadri Kiho and Anto Savi. Celander Ehitus OÜ was selected as the prime constructor.

Gallery

See also

Cross of Liberty (Estonia)
Freedom Monument in Riga
Estonian War of Independence

References

Monuments and memorials in Estonia
Buildings and structures in Tallinn
Cultural infrastructure completed in 2009
2009 establishments in Estonia
National symbols of Estonia
Victory monuments
Kesklinn, Tallinn
Tourist attractions in Tallinn